List of Gunsmoke episodes may refer to:

List of Gunsmoke radio episodes 
List of Gunsmoke television episodes